Angitola Lake or Lago dell'Angitola is a lake at Maierato, Province of Vibo Valentia, Calabria, Italy.

The lake was created artificially from an arm of the river Angitola. Its surface area is 1.96 km².

The lake is a designated wildlife area, managed by WWF Italy.

References

Lakes of Calabria